The following lists events that happened during 1928 in the Union of Soviet Socialist Republics.

Incumbents
 General Secretary of the Communist Party of the Soviet Union – Joseph Stalin
 Chairman of the Central Executive Committee of the Congress of Soviets – Mikhail Kalinin
 Chairman of the Council of People's Commissars of the Soviet Union – Alexei Rykov

Events
 October 1 – The first five-year plan is implemented.

May
 18 May – The Shakhty Trial begins.

Births
 18 January – Alexander Gomelsky, basketball coach
 10 February – Alma Adamkienė, Lithuanian philologist, philanthropist and First Lady of Lithuania 
 5 March – Yelizaveta Dementyeva, sprint canoeist
 7 March – Edgar Elbakyan, Armenian actor (d. 1988)
 10 April – Raïssa Koublitskaïa, Belarusian agricultural worker and politician (d. 2021)
 25 April – Yury Yakovlev, actor
 14 May – Algirdas Šocikas, Lithuanian Olympic heavyweight boxer (d. 2012)
 28 May – Ivan Kizimov, Olympic equestrian
 2 July – Tatyana Piletskaya, actress
 13 July – Valentin Pikul, novelist
 15 July – Aleksandr Zasukhin, Soviet boxer (d. 2012)
 30 July – Valentin Muratov, Olympic gymnast
 2 September – Muhammad Dandamayev, Babylonia historian (d. 2017)
 22 November – Valentin Galochkin, sculptor
 29 November – Tahir Salahov, Azerbaijani painter and educator 
 31 December – Tatyana Shmyga, actress

Deaths
 7 April – Alexander Bogdanov, Bolshevik (born 1873)

See also
 1928 in fine arts of the Soviet Union
 List of Soviet films of 1928
 Soviet grain procurement crisis of 1928

References

 
1920s in the Soviet Union
Years in the Soviet Union
Soviet Union
Soviet Union
Soviet Union